INSAT 3E is a defunct communication satellite built by Indian Space Research Organisation. It was launched on September 28, 2003, from the European Space Agency's spaceport in French Guiana on board the Ariane rocket. The satellite had a launch mass of 2750 kilograms. It is the 4th satellite launched in the INSAT-3 series for INSAT. It was designed for providing high-speed communication, Television, VSAT & Tele-education services and was an important landmark in Indian Space Programme.

In April 2014, almost eleven years after being launched, the satellite ran out of oxidizer and a few days later, was decommissioned by the ISRO. In a few days time, it will  be moved to a graveyard orbit.

Launch 
INSAT 3E was launched from Kourou, French Guiana on September 28, 2003, on European consortium Ariane space's Ariane 5-V162 launcher along with two other satellites viz. Eurobird 3 of Eutelsat and SMART-1 of European Space Agency at 4.44 am IST.It was placed into a geosynchronous transfer orbit 30 minutes after the lift-off, in 3-axis stabilised mode, with a perigee of 649 km and an apogee of 35,923 km and an inclination of 7 deg. with respect to the equator. Its master control facility is at Hassan, Karnataka (India).

Payload 
INSAT 3E payload consists of C-band and extended C-band transponders. It has 24 C-band transponders, having India beam coverage providing an Edge Of Coverage-Effective Isotropic Radiated Power (EOC-EIRP) of 38.5 dBW and 12 upper extended C-band transponders having India beam coverage providing an EOC-EIRP of 38 dBW.

Retirement

On April 1, 2014, Dr. K. Radhakrishnan, while speaking to the Indian English newspaper "The Hindu", said that INSAT 3E had been decommissioned. The newspaper reported that a few days before, the satellite had run out of the on-board oxidiser, which is essential to burn the fuel that kept it Earth-locked (fixed over India) and running its daily functions. The ISRO had apparently expected that the satellite, positioned at 55 degrees E longitude, would last a few more months and that it would be smoothly replaced with GSAT-16. The Master Control Facility at Hassan is due to move the expired satellite into a graveyard orbit.

Services 
 Television
 VSAT
 Communication
 Tele-education providing education to the poor and needy
 Tele-medicine administering medical services from the metros to villages & remote areas

References

External links

 ISRO website 
 Commercial arm of ISRO
 Deptt. of Space Under Deptt. Of Science & Tech., Government Of India

Spacecraft launched in 2003
Communications satellites in geostationary orbit
Satellite Internet access
Satellite television
INSAT satellites
2003 in India